Hostovatnet is a lake in Trøndelag county, Norway. The  lake lies in Orkland Municipality. The village of Hoston is located on the northeastern shore of the lake.

The water leaves the lake primarily through the river Vorma which flows east to the village of Vormstad where it joins the river Orkla. At the southern tip of Hostovatnet there is a short connection to the lake Ringavatnet. The lake is good for fishing trout and Arctic char.

See also
List of lakes in Norway

References

Lakes of Trøndelag
Orkland